Symplocos tacanensis is a species of plant in the family Symplocaceae. It is found in El Salvador and Guatemala. It is threatened by habitat loss and is considered to be a "threatened" species by the International Union for Conservation of Nature and Natural Resources.

References

tacanensis
Vulnerable plants
Taxonomy articles created by Polbot